Two submarines of the French Navy have borne the name Fresnel:

 , a  launched in 1908 and sunk in 1915
 , a  launched in 1929 and scuttled in 1942

French Navy ship names